Serghei Dinov (born 23 April 1969) is a Moldovan goalkeepers coach and former Moldova international footballer, who played as a goalkeeper. Currently Serghei Dinov works as goalkeepers coach at the Moldovan team Zimbru–2 Chișinău, and as well at the Moldova national football team.

Between 1998–2000 Serghei Dinov has played 17 matches for Moldova.

Honours
Constructorul Chișinău
 Divizia Națională: 1996-1997
Runner-up: 1998–99

Moldovan Cup: 1995-1996, 1999-2000

Bugeac Comrat
Moldovan Cup: 1992

References

External links

Serghei Dinov at Soccerpunter
Serghei Dinov at Scoreshelf
Serghei DINOV: Unul din cele mai Memorabile meciuri jucate de mine este contra Turciei în 1999 (Video) 
Serghei Dinov (INTERVIEW) 07.02.14 (sports.md) 

1969 births
Living people
Moldovan footballers
Moldova international footballers
Moldovan football managers
Association football goalkeepers
Moldovan expatriate footballers
FC Tighina players
Gagauziya-Oguzsport players
FC Nistru Otaci players
CS Petrocub Hîncești players
Bnei Sakhnin F.C. players
FC Zimbru Chișinău players
Moldovan Super Liga players
Liga Leumit players
Expatriate footballers in Israel
Moldovan expatriate sportspeople in Israel